The Geena Davis Institute on Gender in Media is a US non-profit research organization that researches gender representation in media and advocates for equal representation of women.

History 

After watching children's TV with her young daughter, Geena Davis noticed that the large majority of these television shows and other media lacked a large number of female characters. Davis sponsored research on this type of entertainment, conducted by Stacy L. Smith at USC's Annenberg School for Communication and Journalism. One study by Smith found that three times more males than females appeared in children's films while in children's television 1.67 males appeared for every 1 female. Another research study from Smith's group showed that in G-rated films, characters in the workplace were 80.5% male and only 19.5% female. In other research sponsored by the Institute and conducted by Smith on 122 "G, PG, and PG-13 films theatrically-released between 2006 and 2009,” “only 29.2% of all speaking characters are female,” and these women are more sexualized than the men. As “children are engaging with media up to 7–10 hours/day,” the representation of women in children's television shows and films has a major impact on how young girls believe they should act and how they view themselves. Davis subsequently founded the eponymous Institute in 2004.

Research impact 
The institute has engaged in several large scale research projects concerning the current conditions for women in mass media. In addition, the Institute collaborates with several other non-profits and for-profit corporations in order to highlight their feelings on the need to reform the way that women are represented in popular culture.

In 2010, the institute, along with the Academy of Television Arts & Sciences Foundation, established a $5000 award for diversity in children's animation created by college students.

In 2022, the institute was awarded the Governors Award by The Board of Governors of the Television Academy which recognizes an individual, company, or organization that has made a profound, transformational, and long-lasting contribution to the arts and/or science of television.

Current partnerships 
The institute has teamed-up with several multi-national corporations to achieve their goal of informing media consumers about the current state of women in popular culture. Recently, the institute has partnered with Ford and several YouTube stars to create a video series entitled #ShesGotDrive. The partnership between Ford and the Institute seeks to highlight several stories of women content creators overcoming significant challenges. The purpose of this campaign is to highlight the power of women in media and inspire other women to follow their dreams. In addition, the campaign seeks “to fight unconscious gender bias in media.” 
The institute has also teamed up with the Girl Scouts of the United States of America (GSUSA) to create a program entitled Girls’ Fast Track Races. With this program, girls construct their own race cars. The program was created in order to foster learning of automobile engineering in young women. Previously, in 2016, the Institute received a 1.2 million dollar grant from Google. Using this grant, the Institute developed the Geena Davis Inclusion Quotient (or GD-IQ). The GD-IQ is an algorithm that can quickly scan a feature-length film to detect gender differences in representation. The Institute believes that the GD-IQ will significantly improve the institute's research of on-screen gender disparities.

In addition to its partnerships with several for-profit corporations, the institute has also partnered with a number of non-profit organizations in order to further the institute's goals. The institute has partnered with the United Nations; and founder Geena Davis is a chair on the California Commission on the Status of Women.

Significant studies 
The institute has completed several large studies around the representation of gender in entertainment media. One study analyzed the disparity between speaking roles for men and women and also what type of roles men and women were shown as portraying on screen. The Institute conducted this research by analyzing G-rated films from from 1990 to 2005 and concluded that fewer than one out of three of the speaking characters (both real and animated) were played by women. Another study looked at gender differences both on screen media and behind the scenes of media production. The Geena Davis Institute investigated and discovered that in the US film industry, only 8% of directors are women, coupled with 19% of producers and 13.6% of writers. Several other studies conducted by the institute concern additional issues regarding gender and media including gender disparity in media across several countries as well as the portrayal of gender in films specifically marketed to young girls and families.
Each year, the institute studies female representation in entertainment and publishes their findings. Through this study, the institute hopes that bringing the facts about media representation to the public's attention will bring positive change for female representation in the media. In 2015, the institute studied the top 100 grossing films of 2014 and 2015 and found that, overall, women spoke less than men and received less screen time in films. However, the study also found that “women had a particularly strong presence in the comedy and action genres.” 

In 2016, the organization found that there were increasingly more female leads in films than ever before. A separate study exemplifies the influence of female leads: after the release of films like The Hunger Games and Brave, both of which feature female archers as leads, the number of girls participating in archery greatly increased. According to Davis, “68% of the film companies they’ve worked with have changed two or more of their projects” to include more female representation.

In partnership with the Lyda Hill Foundation, the institute released a 2018 study of the media representation of female characters in the science, technology, engineering and math career fields. The study showed that men depicted 62.3% of all STEM characters, while women accounted for 37.1%. In a survey of girls and young women, the majority of participants acknowledged the impact of female STEM characters in the media. Particularly influential characters were April Sexton (Chicago Med), Addison Montgomery (Private Practice) and Temperance Brennan (Bones). In addition, the study revealed that female STEM mentors as well as personal connections to female STEM professionals and supportiveness contribute to more girls choosing a career in the field.

In partnership with Equimundo, the institute released a study in 2022 about the representation of male caregivers in popular television programs from 2013 to 2020. The study found a similar number of male and female caregivers shown in the shows, but gender differences in their portrayals. Male caregivers were nearly two times as likely than female caregivers to be shown as incompetent — a perpetuation of the “apprentice dad” trope, and male caregivers were one and a half times more likely than female caregivers to be emotionally abusive, and four times more likely to be physically abusive — a perpetuation of the “abusive dad” trope.

Bentonville Film Festival 
In addition to many of their research contributions, Geena Davis also created the Bentonville Film Festival. Davis founded the Bentonville Film Festival with Trevor Drinkwater. Films that are in the Bentonville film festival are guaranteed distribution, a move that Davis says will fix the disproportionate number of women creators in Hollywood. The yearly festival is held in Bentonville, Arkansas. Nearly 100 films are showcased at the growing festival. The festival also has concerts with various artists each year. In 2018 country singers Carly Pearce and Lauren Alaina performed as well as Jillian Jacqueline, Vintage Troube and Fifth Harmony's Ally Brooke.

See also 
 Exploitation of women in mass media
 Misogyny and mass media
 Media and gender
 Gender equality
 Feminism and media

References

External links 
 
 Bentonville Film Festival website

2004 establishments in California
Think tanks established in 2004
Non-profit organizations based in Los Angeles
 
Feminist art organizations in the United States